Events from the year 1510 in art.

Events
 Giulio Campagnola invents the technique of stippling in engraving

Works

 Albrecht Altdorfer – St. George in the Forest
 Hans Baldung – Three Ages of the Woman and the Death
 Francesco Bianchi (attrib.) – Arion riding on a Dolphin (c. 1509–1510, Ashmolean Museum, Oxford)
 Sandro Botticelli – Adoration of the Christ Child (1500–1510, tondo (round painting), oil on panel)
 Vittore Carpaccio – Young Knight in a Landscape
 Girolamo Genga – The Abduction of Helen
 Giorgione (probably completed after Giorgione's death this year by Titian) – Sleeping Venus
 Lucas van Leyden – The Milkmaid (copper engraving)

Births
 Orazio Alfani, Italian painter of the Renaissance (died 1583)
 Mir Sayyid Ali, Persian illustrator and painter (died 1572)
 Jacopo Bassano, Italian landscape and genre painter (died 1592)
 Hans Besser, German Renaissance portrait painter (died unknown)
 Hans Bocksberger der Ältere, Austrian painter (died 1561)
 Jörg Breu the Younger, German painter, son of Jörg Breu the Elder (died 1547)
 François Clouet, French Renaissance miniaturist and painter (died 1572)
 Hieronymus Cock, Flemish painter and etcher of the Northern Renaissance (died 1570)
 Juan Correa de Vivar, painted at the height of the Spanish Renaissance (Renacimiento) (died 1566) [in Spanish: Juan Correa de Vivar]
 Jerónimo Cosida, Spanish Renaissance painter, sculptor, goldsmith and architect (died 1592)
 Adriaen Pietersz Crabeth, Dutch glass painter (died 1553)
 Wouter Crabeth I, Dutch glass painter (died 1590)
 Francesco de' Rossi (Il Salviati), Italian Mannerist painter from Florence (died 1562)
 Jacopino del Conte, Italian Mannerist painter (died 1598)
 Jacques I Androuet du Cerceau, architect, sculptor, designer (died 1584)
 Antonio Fantuzzi, Italian etcher (died 1550)
 Jean Goujon, French sculptor and architect during the French Renaissance (died 1572)
 Pirro Ligorio, Italian architect, painter, antiquarian and garden designer (died 1583)
 Herri met de Bles, Flemish Northern Renaissance and Mannerist landscape painter (died 1555/1560)
 Filippo Negroli, Italian armourer (died 1579)
 Giuseppe Niccolo Vicentino, Italian painter and wood-engraver of the Renaissance (d. unknown)
 Bernard Palissy, French potter and craftsman (died 1589)
 Battista Franco Veneziano, Italian Mannerist painter and printmaker in etching (died 1561)
 (born 1510/1515): Andrea Schiavone, Renaissance etcher and painter, active mainly in Venice (died 1563)
 (born 1510/1520): Levina Teerlinc, Flemish miniaturist who served as a painter to the English court (died 1576)

Deaths
 By October - Giorgione, Venetian painter (born c. 1477–78) (plague)
 Sandro Botticelli, Italian painter of the Florentine school during the Early Renaissance (Quattrocento) (born 1445)
 Bernardino Zaganelli, Italian Renaissance painter (born 1460-1470)

 
Years of the 16th century in art